Varakļāni is a town in the Latgale historical region of Latvia. The population in 2020 was 1,740.

History 
The town of Varakļāni was founded and established in the Russian Empire in the 18th century.

Varakļāni Palace is located in Varakļāni.

Jews in Varaklani 
Varaklani had a sizeable population of Jews throughout much of its history, ending with the Holocaust. Towards the end of the 19th century, Jews comprised about 75% of the population. Various pogroms, expulsions, WWI and the Russian Revolutions brought the Jewish population down considerably. Several hundred Jews left with the Russians in preparation of the Nazi advance. The Nazis forced 540 remaining Jews to dig their own graves, and then shot them to death in a mass shooting on 4 August 1941. Jewish historical records, including online resources, contain much information about community leadership, organizations, and general town information.

Notable people
 Michael Johann von der Borch, (1753–1810) Polish statesman and writer

See also
 List of cities in Latvia

References

External links
 

Towns in Latvia
1928 establishments in Latvia
Populated places established in 1928
Varakļāni Municipality
Rezhitsky Uyezd
Latgale